Qualification for the 2006 Little League World Series took place in sixteen different parts of the world during July and August 2006, with formats and number of teams varying by region.

United States

Great Lakes

Midwest

New England

Northwest

Mid-Atlantic

Southeast

Southwest

West

International

Asia

Canada

Caribbean

Europe, Middle East, and Africa

Latin America

Mexico

Phase 1

Phase 2

Championship Game

Pacific

Transatlantic

External links
2006 Little League World Series website

2006 Little League World Series